Dynamin-like 120 kDa protein, mitochondrial is a protein that in humans is encoded by the OPA1 gene. This protein regulates mitochondrial fusion and cristae structure in the inner mitochondrial membrane (IMM) and contributes to ATP synthesis and apoptosis, and small, round mitochondria. Mutations in this gene have been implicated in dominant optic atrophy (DOA), leading to loss in vision, hearing, muscle contraction, and related dysfunctions.

Structure 

Eight transcript variants encoding different isoforms, resulting from alternative splicing of exon 4 and two novel exons named 4b and 5b, have been reported for this gene. They fall under two types of isoforms: long isoforms (L-OPA1), which attach to the IMM, and short isoforms (S-OPA1), which localize to the intermembrane space (IMS) near the outer mitochondrial membrane (OMM). S-OPA1 is formed by proteolysis of L-OPA1 at the cleavage sites S1 and S2, removing the transmembrane domain.

Function 

This gene product is a nuclear-encoded mitochondrial protein with similarity to dynamin-related GTPases. It is a component of the mitochondrial network. The OPA1 protein localizes to the inner mitochondrial membrane, where it regulates mitochondrial fusion and cristae structure. OPA1 mediates mitochondrial fusion in cooperation with mitofusins 1 and 2 and participates in cristae remodeling by the oligomerization of two L-OPA1 and one S-OPA1, which then interact with other protein complexes to alter cristae structure. Its cristae regulating function also contributes to its role in oxidative phosphorylation and apoptosis, as it is required to maintain mitochondrial activity during low-energy substrate availability. Moreover, stabilization of mitochondrial cristae by OPA1 protects against mitochondrial dysfunction, cytochrome c release, and reactive oxygen species production, thus preventing cell death. Mitochondrial SLC25A transporters can detect these low levels and stimulate OPA1 oligomerization, leading to tightening of the cristae, enhanced assembly of ATP synthase, and increased ATP production.  Stress from an apoptotic response can interfere with OPA1 oligomerization and prevent mitochondrial fusion.

Clinical significance 

Mutations in this gene have been associated with optic atrophy type 1, which is a dominantly inherited optic neuropathy resulting in progressive loss of visual acuity, leading in many cases to legal blindness. Dominant optic atrophy (DOA) in particular has been traced to mutations in the GTPase domain of OPA1, leading to sensorineural hearing loss, ataxia, sensorimotor neuropathy, progressive external ophthalmoplegia, and mitochondrial myopathy. As the mutations can lead to degeneration of auditory nerve fibres, cochlear implants provide a therapeutic means to improve hearing thresholds and speech perception in patients with OPA1-derived hearing loss.

Mitochondrial fusion involving OPA1 and MFN2 may be associated with Parkinson's disease.

Interactions 

OPA1 has been shown to interact with:
 Adenonucleotide transporters,
 ATP synthase,
 CHCHD3,
 Mitofilin,
 Prohibitin,
 SAMM50, and
 SLC25A.

See also 
 Kjer's optic neuropathy

References

Further reading

External links 
 GeneReview/NCBI/NIH/UW entry on Optic Atrophy Type 1
association kjer-france